Volney Rouse (born December 6, 1983) is an American rugby union player. Rouse plays his club rugby for San Francisco Golden Gate Rugby Club, and also played for the San Francisco Rush in 2016.

Domestic
Rouse played collegiate rugby at St. Mary's College, where he was named to the All-American team in 2006 and 2007. Since college, Rouse has played club rugby with San Francisco Golden Gate in top American club competitions including the Rugby Super League, USA Rugby Elite Cup, and Pacific Rugby Premiership. In 2013, he was part of the SFGG squad that participated in the 2013 World Club 7s.

In 2016, Rouse joined the San Francisco Rush in their inaugural season. Rouse played all twelve matches for the Rush, scoring a league-high 131 points.

International
Rouse was selected once for the United States national rugby union team, coming on as a substitute against Russia in June 2010. He had also been selected to tour with the national team for the Autumn 2010 tour of Europe and with the USA Selects for the 2012 Americas Rugby Championship. Rouse later switched his national team affiliation when he suited up for the Philippine Volcanoes 7s during the 2015 ARFU Men's Sevens Championships. He has also played with the team during their 2016 Asia Rugby Development Sevens Series events.

References

External links
 Video SFGG Wins Rugby Super League

1983 births
Living people
American people of Filipino descent
American rugby union players
United States international rugby union players
San Francisco Rush players
Rugby union fly-halves